The Academy of Sciences of Moldova, established in 1961, is the main scientific organization of Moldova and coordinates research in all areas of science and technology. Ion Tighineanu has been the head of the Academy of Sciences since April 9, 2019.

History
As early as June 1946, the Presidium of the USSR Academy of Sciences decided to establish the Moldovan Research Base of the USSR Academy of Sciences in Chisinau. In October 1949, the research base was transformed into the Moldavian branch of the USSR Academy of Sciences. The grand opening of the Academy took place on August 2, 1961. A meeting of the Academy of Sciences of Moldova in September 1994 confirms the reasoned scientific opinion of philologists that the correct name of the state language of Moldova is Romanian. Since September 2009, the University at the Academy of Sciences of Moldova has been operating in the country. In October 2017, President Igor Dodon signed a law that provides for the reform of the Academy of Sciences of Moldova.

Organization and departments
Management
President: Ion Tighineanu
Vice Presidents: Boris Gaina, Svetlana Cojocaru and Victor Moraru.
Chief Scientific Secretary: Liliana Condraticova
Scientific departments:
Biological, chemical and environmental sciences
Medical Sciences
Physical and Engineering Sciences
Economic sciences
Humanities and Arts
Agricultural Sciences

Liberation Monument
On 23 August 1969, during the 25th anniversary of the Jassy–Kishinev Offensive, a Liberation Monument at the Academy of Sciences was opened. It has been renovated three times, in 1975, 2014 and 2019. Arrchitects ladimir Naumov, Naum Epelbaum and Lazar Dubinovskiy were part of the project.

Presidents
 Iachim Grosul (1961–1976)
 Alexandru Jucenco (1977–1989)
 Andrei Andrieș (1989 – February 5, 2004)
 Gheorghe Duca (February 5, 2004 – April 9, 2019)
 Ion Tighineanu (April 9, 2019 – present)

Gallery

References

External links

  

 
Chișinău
Education in Moldova
Educational organizations based in Moldova
Moldova
Science and technology in Moldova
USSR Academy of Sciences
1946 establishments in the Moldavian Soviet Socialist Republic
Scientific organizations established in 1946
Members of the International Council for Science
Members of the International Science Council